Tinzaparin is an antithrombotic drug in the heparin group. It is a low molecular weight heparin (LMWH) marketed as Innohep worldwide. It has been approved by the U.S. Food and Drug Administration (FDA) for once daily treatment and prophylaxis of deep vein thrombosis (DVT) and pulmonary embolism (PE).  

It can be given subcutaneously by syringe, or intravenously.
It was manufactured by Leo pharmaceutical company, who withdrew the product from the US in 2011 due to low sales and a contamination issue.

Use in elderly
In July 2008, the company revised the prescribing information to restrict the use of tinzaparin in patients 90 years of age or older. FDA is concerned that the preliminary data from the IRIS study suggests that the increased risk of mortality is not limited only to patients 90 years of age or older.

According to the study Innohep increases the risk of death for elderly patients (i.e., 70 years of age and older) with chronic kidney disease. Healthcare professionals should consider the use of alternative treatments to Innohep when treating elderly patients over 70 years of age with chronic kidney disease and deep vein thrombosis, pulmonary embolism, or both.

Use in pregnancy
No LMWH, except tinzaparin, is licensed for use in gestational hypercoagulability. Still, tinzaparin is often the LMWH of choice in pregnant women.

Side effects
Bleeding in overdose. There is occasionally bruising at the site of injection.

Monitoring
Tinzaparin does not affect the international normalized ratio (INR), prothrombin time (PT). Anti-factor Xa levels can be measured, and are often used to monitor tinzaparin.

Reversal agent
Protamine sulfate will reverse tinzaparin by 85% per package insert.

References

 (22)ESHRE April-2011 volume 33 pages 12–13-14
 e-medicine 2011
 RCOG March-2010 (Royal college for Obestetric and Gynecology)
 DVT.org/cardiologist
 Hull, New England Journal of Medicine, 2010 volume 22 page 19

External links
 
 

Heparins